The Kingdom of Bhutan is a sovereign nation, located towards the eastern extreme of the Himalayas mountain range. It is fairly evenly sandwiched between the sovereign territory of two nations: first, the People's Republic of China on the north and northwest. There are approximately 477 kilometres of border with that nation's Tibet Autonomous Region. The second nation is the Republic of India on the south, southwest, and east; there are approximately 659 kilometres with the states of Arunachal Pradesh, Assam, West Bengal, and Sikkim, in clockwise order from the kingdom. Bhutan's total borders amount to 1,139 kilometres. The Republic of Nepal to the west, the India to the south, and the Union of Myanmar to the southeast are other close neighbours; the former two are separated by only very small stretches of Indian territory.

Bhutan is a very compact nation, but with just a small bit more length than width. The nation's territory totals an approximate 38,394 square kilometres. Because of its inland, landlocked status, it controls no territorial waters. Bhutan's territory used to extend south into present-day Assam, including the protectorate of Cooch Behar, but, starting from 1772, the British East India Company began to push back the borders through a number of wars and treaties, severely reducing Bhutan's size until the Treaty of Sinchula of 1865, when some border land was ceded back. Later, many of these territories were permanently lost to British India under the Treaty of Punakha.

Political geography
Bhutan is divided into 20 dzongkhags (districts), and further into 205 gewogs (village blocks). Gewogs are in turn divided into numerous thromdes (municipalities) for administration.

Physical geography

Weather is extreme in the mountains: the high peaks have perpetual snow, and the lesser mountains and hewn gorges have high winds all year round, making them barren brown wind tunnels in summer, and frozen wastelands in winter. The blizzards generated in the north each winter often drift southward into the central highlands.

Below the rock and ice of the highest peaks lies an extensive arc of Eastern Himalayan alpine shrub and meadows, which contain, in additions to grasslands, a wide variety of rhododendrons and herbaceous plants.

The highlands are the most populous part of the nation; the capital Thimphu lies in the western region. The region is characterised by its many rivers (flowing into India's Brahmaputra), its isolated valleys that house most of the population, and the expansive forests that cover seventy percent of the nation. The highlands have Eastern Himalayan subalpine conifer forests at higher elevations and Eastern Himalayan broadleaf forests at lower elevations. Winters are cold, summer are hot; the rainy season is accompanied with frequented landslides.

The valleys of Bhutan are linked by a series of passes ("La" in Dzongkha). Between the Haa Valley and Paro Valley is the Chele La. The Chele La is the highest pass crossed by a Bhutanese highway. The Lateral Road from Thimphu to Punakha crosses the Dochu La, which features 108 chortens built to commemorate the expulsion of Assamese guerrillas. East of Wangdue Phodrang is the Pele La. Continuing to the east along the main highway, other major passes include the Yotang La, Shertang La, Wangthang La, Thrumshing La and Kori La.

The extreme southern strip of the nation consists mostly of Himalayan subtropical broadleaf forests that grade into the tropical plains of the Terai-Duar savanna and grasslands, more typical of India. It is largely agricultural land, producing mostly rice. Only two percent of Bhutan is arable land, with most of it focused here.

Centuries of isolationism, a small population, and topographical extremes have led to Bhutan maintaining one of the most intact ecosystems in the world. The country ranks amongst the top ten countries in the world in terms of species density (species richness per unit area). Over fifty-five hundred varieties of plant life exist, including around 300 medicinal ones. More than 770 species of avifauna and more than 165 species of mammals are known to exist, including many rare and endangered species like the red panda, snow leopard, and golden langur.

Strategic location
Bhutan, situated between India and China, is a potential Sino-Indian battleground; India currently has more political influence in the nation. This stems from two things: the fact that after the British granted sovereignty to their South Asian possessions, Bhutan, a protectorate, was never put under the administration of India, except for its Foreign Relation Policies under the Indo-Bhutan Treaty of 1949. The Indian Army patrols Bhutan's frontiers and has played a major role in the development of the country's road infrastructure. Additionally, the Government of India continues to provide approximately 60% of Bhutan's government finances.

The second reason comes from the aggression against Tibet by China from 1949 to 1959; the Tibetans have strong cultural, historical, and religious connections to Bhutan.

Bhutan controls several strategic mountain passes through the Himalayas, allowing travel between Tibet and Assam. These passes are also the only way into the kingdom, and, coupled with its centuries-old policies of isolationism, it has been called the "Mountain Fortress of the Gods." The heartland of Bhutan has never been successfully invaded; the British, while establishing a protectorate over the nation, did so with threats to the low-lying territories below the highlands.

Climate

Bhutan's climate is as varied as its altitudes and, like India's, is affected by monsoons. Western Bhutan is particularly affected by monsoons that bring between 60 and 90 percent of the region's rainfall. The climate is humid and subtropical in the southern plains and foothills, temperate in the inner Himalayan valleys of the southern and central regions, and cold in the north, with year-round snow on the main Himalayan summits.

Temperatures vary according to elevation. Most of the central portion of the country experiences a cool, temperate climate year-round. In the south, a hot, humid climate helps maintain a fairly even temperature range of between  year-round, although temperatures sometimes reach  in the valleys during the summer.

Annual precipitation ranges widely in various parts of the country.

Bhutan's generally dry spring starts in early March and lasts until mid-April. Summer weather commences in mid-April with occasional showers and continues through the pre-monsoon rains of late June. The summer monsoon lasts from late June through late September with heavy rains from the southwest. The monsoon weather, blocked from its northward progress by the Himalayas, brings heavy rains, high humidity, flash floods and landslides, and numerous misty, overcast days. Autumn, from late September or early October to late November, follows the rainy season. It is characterised by bright, sunny days and some early snowfalls at higher elevations. The winter northeast monsoon brings gale-force winds down through high mountain passes.

Glaciers

Glaciers in northern Bhutan, which covered about 10 percent of the total surface area in the 1980s, are an important renewable source of water for Bhutan's rivers. Fed by fresh snow each winter and slow melting in the summer, the glaciers bring millions of litres of fresh water to Bhutan and downriver areas each year. Glacial melt adds to monsoon-swollen rivers, however, also contributes to flooding. Where glacial movement temporary blocks riverflows, downstream areas may be threatened by glacial lake outburst floods (GLOFs), also called jökulhlaups.

Bhutan's glaciers are melting. A 2008 United Nations report suggested that due to rising temperatures, glaciers in Bhutan were retreating at a rate of 30–40 meters per year, poised to make many lakes burst their banks and send millions of gallons of floodwater downstream. This among many other climate-related issues identified in the report prompted the regional association of government ministers to establish the Southeast Asia Regional Health Emergency Fund in Thimphu in September 2007. Similarly, the member nations of South Asian Association for Regional Cooperation (SAARC) adopted bilateral agreements including measures on climate change and glaciers at its summit in April 2010.

The 2008 UN report also indicated Himalayan glaciers would melt within 25 years, however Prime Minister Jigme Thinley expressed a more dim outlook in a press conference in late March 2010, stating, "Our glaciers are withdrawing very fast and we have reasons to worry that they may in fact disappear not in 2035, but even earlier."

The new inventory "Bhutan Glacial Inventory 2018" includes 700 glaciers covering total area of 629.55±0.02 km2 in the northern frontiers of Bhutan. Glacier area covers 1.64% of the total land cover in Bhutan.

Lakes

Bhutan is home to at least 59 natural mountain lakes as well as some 2,674 glacial lakes; about 25 of these glacial lakes are potential GLOF hazards.

River systems

Bhutan has four major river systems: the Drangme Chhu; the Puna Tsang Chhu, also called the Sankosh; the Wang Chhu; and the Amo Chhu. Each flows swiftly out of the Himalayas, southerly through the Dooars to join the Brahmaputra River in India, and thence through Bangladesh where the Brahmaputra (or Jamuna in Bangladesh) joins the mighty Ganges (or Padma in Bangladesh) to flow into the Bay of Bengal. The largest river system, the Drangme Chhu, flows southwesterly from India's state of Arunachal Pradesh and has three major branches: the Drangme Chhu, Mangde Chhu, and Bumthang Chhu. These branches form the Drangme Chhu basin, which spreads over most of eastern Bhutan and drains the Tongsa and Bumthang valleys. In the Duars, where eight tributaries join it, the Drangme Chhu is called the Manas Chhu. The 320-kilometer-long Puna Tsang Chhu rises in northwestern Bhutan as the Mo Chhu and Pho Chhu, which are fed by the snows from the Great Himalayan Range. They flow southerly to Punakha, where they join to form the Puna Tsang Chhu, which flows southerly into India's state of West Bengal. The tributaries of the 370-kilometer-long Wang Chhu rise in Tibet. The Wang Chhu itself flows southeasterly through west-central Bhutan, drains the Ha, Paro, and Thimphu valleys, and continues into the Duars, where it enters West Bengal as the Raigye Chhu. The smallest river system, the Torsa Chhu, known as the Amo Chhu in its northern reaches, also flows out of Tibet into the Chumbi Valley and swiftly through western Bhutan before broadening near Phuntsholing and then flowing into India.

Valleys

Bhutan's valleys are carved into the Himalaya by its rivers, fed by glacial melt and monsoon rains. Much of the Bhutanese population is concentrated in valleys and lowlands, separated by rugged southward spurs of the Inner Himalaya. Despite modernization and development of transport in Bhutan, including a national highway system, travel from one valley to the next remains difficult. Western valleys are bound to the east by the Black Mountains in central Bhutan, which form a watershed between two major river systems, the Mo Chhu (Sankosh River) and the Drangme Chhu. Central valleys are separated from the east by the Donga Range. The more isolated mountain valleys protect several tiny, distinct cultural and linguistic groups.

References

 

bn:ভুটান#ভূগোল